Woodville Park is a suburb in the northwestern suburbs of Adelaide, South Australia, around 8 km from the city centre. Woodville Park is bordered to the north by Torrens Road, to the east by Kilkenny Road and David Terrace, to the south by Port Road and to the west by Park Street. It is crossed by the Outer Harbor railway line (southeast to northwest) and is served by the Woodville Park railway station at the northwest end and by Kilkenny railway station on the other side of David Terrace.

References

Suburbs of Adelaide